Pascal Huser (born 17 April 1995) is a Dutch football player who plays for ACV Assen.

Club career
He made his professional debut in the Eerste Divisie for MVV Maastricht on 25 January 2015 in a game against VVV-Venlo.

References

External links
 
 

1995 births
Living people
Dutch footballers
MVV Maastricht players
Eerste Divisie players
FC Emmen players
Association football forwards
Footballers from Emmen, Netherlands
Asser Christelijke Voetbalvereniging players